In mathematics, the inverse trigonometric functions (occasionally also called arcus functions, antitrigonometric functions or cyclometric functions) are the inverse functions of the trigonometric functions (with suitably restricted domains). Specifically, they are the inverses of the sine, cosine, tangent, cotangent, secant, and cosecant functions, and are used to obtain an angle from any of the angle's trigonometric ratios. Inverse trigonometric functions are widely used in engineering, navigation, physics, and geometry.

Notation 

Several notations for the inverse trigonometric functions exist. (This convention is used throughout this article.) This notation arises from the following geometric relationships:
when measuring in radians, an angle of θ radians will correspond to an arc whose length is rθ, where r is the radius of the circle. Thus in the unit circle, "the arc whose cosine is x" is the same as "the angle whose cosine is x", because the length of the arc of the circle in radii is the same as the measurement of the angle in radians. In computer programming languages, the inverse trigonometric functions are often called by the abbreviated forms asin, acos, atan.

The confusion is somewhat mitigated by the fact that each of the reciprocal trigonometric functions has its own name—for example,  = . Nevertheless, certain authors advise against using it for its ambiguity. Wolfram's Mathematica, and University of Sydney's MAGMA) use those very same capitalised representations for the standard trig functions; whereas others (Python (ie SymPy and NumPy), Matlab, MAPLE etc) use lower-case. 

Hence, since 2009, the ISO 80000-2 standard has specified solely the "arc" prefix for the inverse functions.

Basic concepts

Principal values
Since none of the six trigonometric functions are one-to-one, they must be restricted in order to have inverse functions. Therefore, the result ranges of the inverse functions are proper (i.e. strict) subsets of the domains of the original functions.

For example, using  in the sense of multivalued functions, just as the square root function  could be defined from  the function  is defined so that  For a given real number  with  there are multiple (in fact, countably infinitely many) numbers  such that ; for example,  but also   etc. When only one value is desired, the function may be restricted to its principal branch. With this restriction, for each  in the domain, the expression  will evaluate only to a single value, called its principal value. These properties apply to all the inverse trigonometric functions.

The principal inverses are listed in the following table.

Note: Some authors  define the range of arcsecant to be , because the tangent function is nonnegative on this domain. This makes some computations more consistent. For example, using this range,  whereas with the range , we would have to write  since tangent is nonnegative on  but nonpositive on  For a similar reason, the same authors define the range of arccosecant to be  or 

If  is allowed to be a complex number, then the range of  applies only to its real part.

Solutions to elementary trigonometric equations 

Each of the trigonometric functions is periodic in the real part of its argument, running through all its values twice in each interval of :

This periodicity is reflected in the general inverses, where  is some integer.

The following table shows how inverse trigonometric functions may be used to solve equalities involving the six standard trigonometric functions. 
It is assumed that the given values     and  all lie within appropriate ranges so that the relevant expressions below are well-defined. 
Note that "for some " is just another way of saying "for some integer "

The symbol  is logical equality.  The expression "LHS  RHS" indicates that  (a) the left hand side (i.e. LHS) and right hand side (i.e. RHS) are  true, or else (b) the left hand side and right hand side are  false; there is  option (c) (e.g. it is  possible for the LHS statement to be true and also simultaneously for the RHS statement to false), because otherwise "LHS  RHS" would not have been written (see this footnote for an example illustrating this concept).

Detailed example and explanation of the "plus or minus" symbol 

which is a shorthand way of saying that (at least) one of the following statement is true: 
 for some integer  or 
 for some integer  
However, if  then the integer  is unique and completely determined by  
If   (which by definition only happens when ) then  (because  and  so in both cases  is equal to ) and so the statements (1) and (2) happen to be identical in this particular case (and so both hold). 
Having considered the cases  and  we now focus on the case where  and  So assume this from now on.

which as before is shorthand for saying that one of statements (1) and (2) is true. However this time, because  and  statements (1) and (2) are different and furthermore, exactly one of the two equalities holds (not both). Then 
 
and moreover, in this particular case  (for both the  case and the  case) and so consequently,

This means that  could be either  or  Without additional information it is not possible to determine which of these values  has. 
An example of some additional information that could determine the value of  would be knowing that the angle is above the -axis (in which case ) or alternatively, knowing that it is below the -axis (in which case ). 

Transforming equations

The equations above can be transformed by using the reflection and shift identities:

These formulas imply, in particular, that the following hold:

where swapping  swapping  and swapping  gives the analogous equations for  respectively.

So for example, by using the equality  the equation  can be transformed into  which allows for the solution to the equation  (where ) to be used; that solution being: 

which becomes:

The substitution  may be used express the right hand side of the above formula in terms of  instead of

Equal identical trigonometric functions

Relationships between trigonometric functions and inverse trigonometric functions 

Trigonometric functions of inverse trigonometric functions are tabulated below. A quick way to derive them is by considering the geometry of a right-angled triangle, with one side of length 1 and another side of length  then applying the Pythagorean theorem and definitions of the trigonometric ratios. Purely algebraic derivations are longer. It is worth noting that for arcsecant and arccosecant, the diagram assumes that  is positive, and thus the result has to be corrected through the use of absolute values and the signum (sgn) operation.

Relationships among the inverse trigonometric functions

Complementary angles:

Negative arguments:

Reciprocal arguments:

Useful identities if one only has a fragment of a sine table:

Whenever the square root of a complex number is used here, we choose the root with the positive real part (or positive imaginary part if the square was negative real).

A useful form that follows directly from the table above is

.

It is obtained by recognizing that .

From the half-angle formula, we get:

Arctangent addition formula

This is derived from the tangent addition formula

by letting

In calculus

Derivatives of inverse trigonometric functions

The derivatives for complex values of z are as follows:

Only for real values of x:

For a sample derivation: if , we get:

Expression as definite integrals
Integrating the derivative and fixing the value at one point gives an expression for the inverse trigonometric function as a definite integral:

When x equals 1, the integrals with limited domains are improper integrals, but still well-defined.

Infinite series
Similar to the sine and cosine functions, the inverse trigonometric functions can also be calculated using power series, as follows. For arcsine, the series can be derived by expanding its derivative, as a binomial series, and integrating term by term (using the integral definition as above). The series for arctangent can similarly be derived by expanding its derivative  in a geometric series, and applying the integral definition above (see Leibniz series).

 

Series for the other inverse trigonometric functions can be given in terms of these according to the relationships given above.  For example, and so on.  Another series is given by:

Leonhard Euler found a series for the arctangent that converges more quickly than its Taylor series:

 
(The term in the sum for n = 0 is the empty product, so is 1.)

Alternatively, this can be expressed as

Another series for the arctangent function is given by

where  is the imaginary unit.

Continued fractions for arctangent
Two alternatives to the power series for arctangent are these generalized continued fractions:

 

The second of these is valid in the cut complex plane. There are two cuts, from −i to the point at infinity, going down the imaginary axis, and from i to the point at infinity, going up the same axis. It works best for real numbers running from −1 to 1. The partial denominators are the odd natural numbers, and the partial numerators (after the first) are just (nz)2, with each perfect square appearing once. The first was developed by Leonhard Euler; the second by Carl Friedrich Gauss utilizing the Gaussian hypergeometric series.

Indefinite integrals of inverse trigonometric functions

For real and complex values of z:

For real x ≥ 1:

For all real x not between -1 and 1:

The absolute value is necessary to compensate for both negative and positive values of the arcsecant and arccosecant functions. The signum function is also necessary due to the absolute values in the derivatives of the two functions, which create two different solutions for positive and negative values of x. These can be further simplified using the logarithmic definitions of the inverse hyperbolic functions:

The absolute value in the argument of the arcosh function creates a negative half of its graph, making it identical to the signum logarithmic function shown above.

All of these antiderivatives can be derived using integration by parts and the simple derivative forms shown above.

Example
Using  (i.e. integration by parts), set

Then

which by the simple substitution  yields the final result:

Extension to complex plane 

Since the inverse trigonometric functions are analytic functions, they can be extended from the real line to the complex plane. This results in functions with multiple sheets and branch points. One possible way of defining the extension is:

where the part of the imaginary axis which does not lie strictly between the branch points (−i and +i) is the branch cut between the principal sheet and other sheets. The path of the integral must not cross a branch cut. For z not on a branch cut, a straight line path from 0 to z is such a path.

The arcsine function may then be defined as:

where (the square-root function has its cut along the negative real axis and) the part of the real axis which does not lie strictly between −1 and +1 is the branch cut between the principal sheet of arcsin and other sheets;

which has the same cut as arcsin;

which has the same cut as arctan;

where the part of the real axis between −1 and +1 inclusive is the cut between the principal sheet of arcsec and other sheets;

which has the same cut as arcsec.

Logarithmic forms
These functions may also be expressed using complex logarithms. This extends their domains to the complex plane in a natural fashion. The following identities for principal values of the functions hold everywhere that they are defined, even on their branch cuts.

Generalization

Because all of the inverse trigonometric functions output an angle of a right triangle, they can be generalized by using Euler's formula to form a right triangle in the complex plane. Algebraically, this gives us:

or

or

Since the length of the hypotenuse doesn't change the angle, ignoring the real part of  also removes  from the equation. In the final equation, we see that the angle of the triangle in the complex plane can be found by inputting the lengths of each side. By setting one of the three sides equal to 1 and one of the remaining sides equal to our input , we obtain a formula for one of the inverse trig functions, for a total of six equations. Because the inverse trig functions require only one input, we must put the final side of the triangle in terms of the other two using the Pythagorean Theorem relation

The table below shows the values of a, b, and c for each of the inverse trig functions and the equivalent expressions for  that result from plugging the values into the equations above and simplifying.

In order to match the principal branch of the natural log and square root functions to the usual principal branch of the inverse trig functions, the particular form of the simplified formulation matters.

In this sense, all of the inverse trig functions can be thought of as specific cases of the complex-valued log function. Since these definition work for any complex-valued , the definitions allow for hyperbolic angles as outputs and can be used to further define the inverse hyperbolic functions. Elementary proofs of the relations may also proceed via expansion to exponential forms of the trigonometric functions.

Example proof

Using the exponential definition of sine, and letting 

(the positive branch is chosen)

Applications

Finding the angle of a right triangle 

Inverse trigonometric functions are useful when trying to determine the remaining two angles of a right triangle when the lengths of the sides of the triangle are known. Recalling the right-triangle definitions of sine and cosine, it follows that

Often, the hypotenuse is unknown and would need to be calculated before using arcsine or arccosine using the Pythagorean Theorem:  where  is the length of the hypotenuse. Arctangent comes in handy in this situation, as the length of the hypotenuse is not needed.

For example, suppose a roof drops 8 feet as it runs out 20 feet. The roof makes an angle θ with the horizontal, where θ may be computed as follows:

In computer science and engineering

Two-argument variant of arctangent

The two-argument atan2 function computes the arctangent of y / x given y and x, but with a range of (−, ]. In other words, atan2(y, x) is the angle between the positive x-axis of a plane and  the point (x, y) on it, with positive sign for counter-clockwise angles (upper half-plane, y > 0), and negative sign for clockwise angles (lower half-plane, y < 0). It was first introduced in many computer programming languages, but it is now also common in other fields of science and engineering.
 
In terms of the standard arctan function, that is with range of (−), it can be expressed as follows:

It also equals the principal value of the argument of the complex number x + iy.

This limited version of the function above may also be defined using the tangent half-angle formulae as follows:

provided that either x > 0 or y ≠ 0. However this fails if given x ≤ 0 and y = 0 so the expression is unsuitable for computational use.

The above argument order (y, x) seems to be the most common, and in particular is used in ISO standards such as the C programming language, but a few authors may use the opposite convention (x, y) so some caution is warranted.  These variations are detailed at atan2.

Arctangent function with location parameter
In many applications the solution  of the equation  is to come as close as possible to a given value . The adequate solution is produced by the parameter modified arctangent function 

The function  rounds to the nearest integer.

Numerical accuracy

Computer applications thus need to consider the stability of inputs to these functions and the sensitivity of their calculations, or use alternate methods.

See also

Arcsine distribution
Inverse exsecant
Inverse versine
Inverse hyperbolic functions
List of integrals of inverse trigonometric functions
List of trigonometric identities
Trigonometric function
Trigonometric functions of matrices

Notes

References

External links

 
Trigonometry
Elementary special functions
Mathematical relations
Ratios
Dimensionless numbers